The 2020 Bommarito Automotive Group 500 was an IndyCar Series event that took place from August 29-30, 2020. It made up the eighth and ninth rounds of the 2020 IndyCar Series season. Initially scheduled to be just one race, the event was extended to a doubleheader weekend after cancellations of the events at Portland and Laguna Seca due to the COVID-19 pandemic. The races were also made 50 laps shorter than in years past to account for the doubleheader format.

Entry list
Separate entry lists were released for both events with identical participants, apart from a sponsor change for Felix Rosenqvist from NTT Data to Monster Energy.

All cars run a Dallara safety tub utilizing the IndyCar mandated Universal Aero Kit 18. All cars also will utilize Firestone tires.

Practice
Patricio O'Ward was fastest in practice with a time of 24.789 seconds and a speed of 181.532 mph (292.147 km/h).

Combined Qualifying Session, August 29
The pole for Saturday's race was won by Will Power with a time of 24.6718 seconds. Takuma Sato won the pole for Sunday's race with a time of 24.6577 seconds.

Race 1 – August 29
The first 14 laps of the race were run under caution as a result of a six-car crash coming to the green flag. Álex Palou pulled out of line, and was followed by Simon Pagenaud and Oliver Askew. Askew hit Pagenaud, who in turn collected Alexander Rossi. The resulting incident took out Zach Veach, Marco Andretti, and Ed Carpenter, leading to three of the five Andretti Autosport cars retiring inside the opening five laps. Scott Dixon won the event, his fourth of the season, extending his points lead over Josef Newgarden to 117 points.

Race

Notes:
 Points include 1 point for leading at least 1 lap during a race, an additional 2 points for leading the most race laps, and 1 point for Pole Position.

Race 2 had no DNFs.

Race statistics

Lead changes: 6

Average speed:

Championship standings after the race

Drivers' Championship standings

Engine Manufacturer standings

 Note: Only the top five positions are included.

Race 2 – August 30
The second race began under caution after a vehicle spilled oil on the track during the pace laps. Josef Newgarden won the race, his second win of the season.

Race

Notes:
 Points include 1 point for leading at least 1 lap during a race, an additional 2 points for leading the most race laps, and 1 point for Pole Position.

Race statistics

Lead changes: 8

Average speed:

Championship standings after the race

Drivers' Championship standings

Engine Manufacturer standings

 Note: Only the top five positions are included.

References

2020 in IndyCar
2020 in sports in Illinois
August 2020 sports events in the United States